The 2007 Italian Figure Skating Championships was held in Trento from January 4 through 7, 2007. Skaters competed in the disciplines of men's singles, ladies' singles, pair skating, ice dancing, and synchronized skating on the levels of senior and junior, and novice synchronized. The results were used to choose the teams to the 2007 World Championships, the 2007 European Championships, and the 2007 World Junior Championships.

Senior results

Men

Ladies

Pairs

Ice dancing

Synchronized

External links
 results

Italian Figure Skating Championships
2006 in figure skating
Italian Figure Skating Championships, 2007
2007 in Italian sport